Jason Cranford Teague is a web designer and author. He designed Computer-Mediated Communications Magazine, the first online magazine, in 1994.

He is best known for his books CSS3 Visual Quickstart (2013) and Fluid Web Typography (2012).

Cranford Teague started as a web designer in 1994. Notable clients include EPA, IRS, Sargento, USDA, Aspen Institute, Marriott, Bank of America, Cisco, Coca-Cola, Virgin Group, CNN, Kodak, and WebMD.

Books published 
Teague has written several books and articles about web design and media. His books include the best selling DHTML and CSS for the World Wide Web (originally 1999, fifth printing 2013), Final Cut Pro 4 and the Art of Filmmaking (2004), Photoshop at Your Fingertips (2004), and Speaking In Styles (2009).

Published
 CSS3 Visual Quickstart, 6th edition
 Fluid Web Typography: A Guide
 Speaking In Styles: A CSS Primer for Web Designers
 CSS3 Visual Quickstart, 5th edition
 CSS, DHTML, & Ajax: Visual Quickstart Guide, 4th
 DHTML & CSS Advanced

Out of print
 Photoshop at Your Fingertips, 2nd edition
 Photoshop at Your Fingertips
 Final Cut Express Essentials
 SVG for Web Designers
 Final Cut Pro and the Art of Filmmaking, 2nd Edition
 Final Cut Pro and the Art of Filmmaking
 DHTML & CSS Visual QuickStart, 3rd edition
 DHTML & CSS Visual QuickStart, 2nd edition
 DHTML Visual Quickstart
 How to program HTML Frames: Interface Design and Javascript

Articles published

Teague has contributed numerous articles to Apple Developers Connection, Computer Arts Magazine, and Macworld Magazine. He writes regularly about technology, politics, and culture on webbedENVIRONMENTS. He has also appeared on TechTV's The Screen Savers.

References 
 dmx zone
 webbedENVIRONMENTS
 Jason Cranford Teague's blog

Technology writers
Living people
Year of birth missing (living people)